Baruch Agadati (also Baruch Kaushansky-Agadati; January 8, 1895 – January 18, 1976) was a Russian Empire-born Israeli classical ballet dancer, choreographer, painter, and film producer and director.

Biography
Baruch Kaushansky (later Agadati) was born to a Jewish family in Bessarabia, and grew up in Odessa. He immigrated to the region of Palestine in the early 1900s. In Palestine, he was known for performing Jewish folk dances in an expressionist style, often in solo performances he called "concerts" in which he would portray different Shtetl characters. His bohemian stylings -- one performance featured him openly urinating on the back wall of the stage -- scandalized the middle class.

Agadati attended the Bezalel Academy of Arts and Design in Jerusalem from 1910–14. When World War I started in 1914, he was in Russia visiting his parents and was unable to return to Palestine. He remained there and studied classical ballet, joining the dance troupe of the Odessa Opera and Ballet Theater. In 1919, he returned to Palestine. In 1920, he moved to the Neve Tzedek neighborhood in Tel Aviv. Until his death is 1976, he worked in theatre, painted, danced and choreographed Israeli folkdance, produced the famous Purim "Ad DeLo Yada" Carnival balls. He is buried in Trumpeldor Cemetery in Tel Aviv.

Dance and film career
Kaushansky returned to Russia during the First World War and took the name Agadati. After Agadati's return to Palestine in 1919, he began to give solo dance recitals and became one of the pioneers of cinema in Israel. Agadati purchased cinematographer Yaakov Ben Dov's film archives in 1934, when Ben Dov retired from filmmaking. He and his brother Yitzhak used it to start the AGA Newsreel. He directed the early Zionist film entitled This is the Land (1935), the first Hebrew speaking film, and a new version in 1963, called "Tomorrow's Yesterday.".

In the 1920s and 1930s, he was known for organizing Adloyada Tel Aviv Purim balls.

Agadati's costume for "Yihie" ("Yemenite Ecstasy"), a solo show that also toured Europe and South America, was designed by Natalia Goncharova of Ballets Russes.

In 1924, Agadati choreographed a dance based on the Romanian Hora that became known as "Hora Agadati". It was performed by the Ohel Workers' Theatre, which toured pioneer settlements in the Jezreel Valley. The dancers form a circle, holding hands and move counterclockwise following a six-beat step in a walk-walk-step-kick-step-kick pattern.

Education
 1910 Bezalel Academy of Art and Design, Jerusalem, with Boris Schatz
 1914-19 Dance and painting, Odessa
 1930 Painting, Florence

Teaching
 Odessa, classical ballet, painting and music

Awards and recognition
 1976 Worthy Citizen of Tel Aviv Award, Municipality of Tel Aviv-Yafo

Gallery
Archival photographs of Baruch Agadati in costume, taken during the late 1920s.
Photographer: Atelier Willinger, Vienna
Collection of the Bat Sheva and Yitzhak Katz Archive, Information Center for Israeli Art, Israel Museum, Jerusalem

See also
 Cinema of Israel
 Dance of Israel
 Visual arts in Israel

References

Sources
 Judaica Reference Sources 
 Young Tel Aviv: A Tale of Two Cities - Google Books 
 Exhibitions of Baruch Agadati: Painting on Silk. Selfridges Gallery, 1967

External links 

 
 
 
 Hora Agadati dance at Youtube
 The Spielberg Jewish Film Archive - Agadati Screen of an Artist

1895 births
1976 deaths
People from Bender, Moldova
People from Bendersky Uyezd
Moldovan Jews
Bessarabian Jews
Emigrants from the Russian Empire to the Ottoman Empire
Ashkenazi Jews in Ottoman Palestine
Ashkenazi Jews in Mandatory Palestine
Israeli people of Moldovan-Jewish descent
Israeli film directors
Israeli male dancers
Israeli male painters
Israeli male ballet dancers
Israeli choreographers
Israeli film producers
Jewish artists
Jewish painters
History of Purim
20th-century Israeli painters
Bezalel Academy of Arts and Design alumni
Burials at Trumpeldor Cemetery